This is a non-exhaustive list of known dolphinariums worldwide. Many of these places are more than just dolphinariums; the list includes themeparks, marine mammal parks, zoos or aquariums that may also have more than one species of dolphin. The current status of parks marked with an asterisk (*) is unknown; these parks may have closed down, moved, changed names or no longer house any dolphins. Due to the large number of facilities worldwide, this list may not be complete. Facilities only housing porpoises are not listed.

Though Egypt and Russia are transcontinental countries, for the sake of keeping information together they have been listed under Africa and Europe respectively.

Africa

South Africa 
 uShaka Marine World

Tunisia 
Friguia Park

East Asia

China mainland
 Beijing Aquarium
 Chengdu Haichang Polar Ocean World
 Chimelong Ocean Kingdom
 Grandview Mall Aquarium
 Nanjing Underwater World
 Shanghai Haichang Ocean Park
 Shenzhen Safari Park

Hong Kong
 Ocean Park Hong Kong

Japan
 Adventure World (Japan)
 Aqua World – Oarai, Ibaraki
 Asamushi Aquarium – Aomori, Aomori
 Inubōsaki Marine Park, Choshi
 Kamogawa Sea World
 Marine World Uminonakamichi
 Marinepia Matsushima Aquarium
 Notojima Aquarium
 Okinawa Churaumi Aquarium
 Osaka Aquarium Kaiyukan
 Aqua Park Shinagawa
 Notojima Aquarium
 Port of Nagoya Public Aquarium
 Sendai Umino-Mori Aquarium
 Toba Aquarium
 Yokohama Hakkeijima Sea Paradise
 Kagoshima Aquarium
 Umi Kirara Saikai National Park Aquarium

South Korea
 Aqua Planet Jeju
 Dolphinarium at Seoul Grand Park

Taiwan
 Yehliu Ocean World

Europe

Belgium
 Boudewijn Seapark Dolphinarium, Bruges

France
 Marineland of Antibes
 Planète Sauvage
 Moorea dolphin center (InterContinental Moorea Resort & Spa, Moorea Island, French Polynesia)

Germany
 Duisburg Zoo
 Nuremberg Zoo

Greece
 Attica Zoological Park

Italy
 Aquarium of Genoa

Netherlands
 Dolfinarium Harderwijk

Portugal
 Jardim Zoológico de Lisboa

Russia
 Moskvarium

Spain

 Aqualand, Costa Adeje, Tenerife
 Loro Parque, Tenerife
 Mundomar, Costa Blanca
 L'Oceanogràfic, Valencia
 Palmitos Park, Gran Canaria
 Selwo Marina, Benalmádena
 Zoo Aquarium de Madrid, Madrid

Sweden
 Kolmården Wildlife Park, Bråviken bay

North America

Canada
 Marineland of Canada

Mexico
 Delphinus Xcaret
 Delphinus Xel-Ha

United States
 Aquatica, Orlando
 Brookfield Zoo, Illinois
 Clearwater Marine Aquarium
 Discovery Cove
 Dolphin Research Center
 Georgia Aquarium
 Gulf World Marine Park
 Indianapolis Zoo
 Long Marine Laboratory / Institute of Marine Sciences

 Marineland of Florida
 Miami Seaquarium
 Mississippi Aquarium
 Mystic Aquarium (only Beluga whales)*
 National Aquarium in Baltimore
 Sea Life Park Hawaii
 SeaWorld Orlando, Florida
 SeaWorld San Antonio, Texas
 SeaWorld San Diego, California
 Shedd Aquarium, Illinois
 Six Flags Marine World's Dolphin Harbor (also known as Merlin's Dolphin Harbor), Vallejo
 Texas State Aquarium
 Theater of the Sea
 Walt Disney World's The Seas with Nemo & Friends pavilion
 Ocean Adventures Marine Park, Mississippi
 Institute for Marine Mammal Studies, Mississippi

Pacific

Australia
 Sea World

South / Central America and the Caribbean

Argentina
 Mundo Marino

Bahamas
 Atlantis Paradise Island, Dolphin Cay
 Dolphin Encounters Blue Lagoon Island

Colombia
 Rodadero Sea Aquarium and Museum

Cuba
 Acuario Nacional de Cuba *
 Baconao Park

Jamaica
 Dolphin Cove Jamaica

Southeast Asia

Indonesia
 Gelanggang Samudra at Ancol Dreamland

Philippines
 Misamis Occidental Aquamarine Park, Libertad Bago, Sinacaban, Misamis Occidental
 Ocean Adventure, Morong, Bataan

Singapore
 Dolphin Island at Resorts World Sentosa

Thailand
 Safari World dolphinarium, Bangkok

West Asia

Iran
 Aqua Lion, Namakabrood
 Dolphinarium, Tabriz
 Kish Island Dolphin Park, Kish Island
 Milad Tower Dolphinarium, Tehran

Israel

 Dolphin Reef, Eilat

United Arab Emirates
 Atlantis, The Palm (dolphin bay)
 Dubai Dolphinarium

See also

 List of aquaria
 List of zoos
List of captive orcas

References

Lists of buildings and structures
Lists of aquaria
Cetacean-related lists